Buckleria paludum, the European sundew moth, is a moth of the family Pterophoridae first described by Philipp Christoph Zeller in 1839. It is found in Asia and Europe.

Description
In western Europe, adults are found from June to August, flying low on the ground in the afternoon and again from dusk when it comes to light. There are two generations per year.

The larvae feed on the leaves and pods of a carnivorous plant, the round-leaved sundew (Drosera rotundifolia), leaving deposits of green frass.

Distribution
It has a wide range in the Palearctic and Oriental region and is found from Europe to Japan, as well as India and Sri Lanka.

References

External links
  Taxonomic and Biological Studies of Pterophoridae of Japan (Lepidoptera)
 Japanese Moths

Oxyptilini
Moths described in 1839
Palearctic Lepidoptera
Plume moths of Asia
Plume moths of Europe
Taxa named by Philipp Christoph Zeller